Stadion DYuSSh Arsenal is the home ground of Russian Professional Football League farm club FC Arsenal-2 Tula. The infrastructure has a maximum capacity of 1000.

References

Football venues in Russia
FC Arsenal Tula
Sport in Tula, Russia